Philippaerts is an originally Flemish given name and may refer to:

David Philippaerts (born 1983), Italian Grand Prix motocross world champion
Ludo Philippaerts (born 1963), Belgian show jumping rider
Nicola Philippaerts and Olivier Philippaerts (born 1993), twin sons of Ludo, both Belgian show jumping rider as well